Group 42 (also known as G42) is an artificial intelligence and cloud computing company that was founded in Abu Dhabi, United Arab Emirates (UAE) in 2018. The organization is oriented to development of AI  industries in the government sector, healthcare, finance, oil and gas, aviation and hospitality.

Corporate History 

Group 42 was founded in 2017. and is based in Abu Dhabi, United Arab Emirates. It comprises a multidisciplinary and diverse team of data scientists and engineers. The company performs fundamental AI research and development process on big data, AI, and machine learning  via its subsidiary the Inception Institute of Artificial Intelligence (IIAI).

Partnership 

G42 works in partnerships including joint ventures, strategic teaming agreements, and direct investment made by G42.

Acquisition 

Bayanat: On 14 January 2020, G42 announced the acquisition of Bayanat for Mapping and Surveying Services LLC, an end-to-end and custom provider of geospatial data products and services. The acquisition was said to complement G42's suite of satellite-based solutions, leveraging its proficiency in data analytics and artificial intelligence methods.

Partnership 

Alibaba Cloud: Alibaba Cloud in partnership with G42, hosted the first MEA Internet Summit. The event was held with the aim of drawing the participation of technology experts and executives from the top 100 Internet companies in the region. The summit took place at the time of the Ghyma Conference 2019.
Adalytyx: On 23 December 2019, Group 42 announced signing an agreement of strategic partnership with Abu Dhabi Developmental Holding Company (ADDH) for the establishment of a joint venture called Adalytyx.

Investment 

ToTok: Group 42 was reportedly the sole registered shareholder of the free messaging, video, and voice calling mobile application, ToTok.  The application was downloaded by users in the Middle East, Asia, Europe, North America, and Africa, within several months. The application was accused of being "used by the government of the United Arab Emirates to try to track every conversation, movement, relationship, appointment, sound and image of those who install it," in a New York Times exposé in December 2019. Following the allegations, the application was removed by Apple and Google from their application stores. Reportedly, the CEO of G42 has also been running Pegasus – a subsidiary of an Emirati security firm, DarkMatter, which received scrutiny over the hiring of former CIA and NSA officials to spy on Americans, dissidents, and political rivals. The company, however, denies having any connection with DarkMatter.

Collaboration 

Rafael and IAI: On 2 July 2020, G42 announced the signing a memorandum of understanding with two Israeli defense groups – Rafael and Israel Aerospace Industries – to research and develop methods to combat the COVID-19 pandemic. The Israeli defense firms’ subsidiary Elta confirmed the agreement.
NanoScent: The healthcare subsidiary of G42 signed a preliminary agreement with NanoScent, Israel, on 19 August 2020, for the development  of a test capable of detecting COVID-19 from the air exhaled ScentCheck,.. The Emirati News Agency claimed the device could deliver results in 30 to 60 seconds. G42 was said to undergo several tests for the device in the forthcoming weeks.
BGI Group: Tahnoun bin Zayed-linked  Group 42 was reported to have donated Chinese-made Covid testing kits to Nevada. These testing kits were objected to by the US intelligence and security officials, who raised concerns over privacy risks, citing that the gene-sequencing machines of the BGI Group could misuse the patients’ DNA. G42 is also reportedly working with BGI on a project for collecting genetic data of the UAE citizens to “generate the highest quality, most comprehensive genome data”.

References 

Companies based in Abu Dhabi
Information technology companies of the United Arab Emirates
Technology companies established in 2018
Emirati companies established in 2018